Beaverdam Creek is a stream in Hickman County, Tennessee, in the United States. It is a tributary of Duck River.

Beaverdam Creek was named on account of the remains of a beaver dam found in the creek by pioneer settlers.

See also
List of rivers of Tennessee

References

Rivers of Hickman County, Tennessee
Rivers of Tennessee